is a Japanese actress who had a long and varied career working both in pink film and mainstream cinema.

Career 
Junko Miyashita was born in Tokyo on January 29, 1949. She was working as a waitress at a coffee shop when she was recruited to work in Pink films.
Her work in Nikkatsu's Roman Porno genre included eight entries in the Apartment Wife series from 1972 until 1974. She worked with leading pink film director Kōji Wakamatsu, and some of the best directors in Nikkatsu's Roman Porno films, including Noboru Tanaka, and Tatsumi Kumashiro. Among the highlights of her early career were starring roles in Tanaka's Showa Trilogy (A Woman Called Sada Abe (1975), Watcher in the Attic (1976), and Beauty's Exotic Dance: Torture! (1977)). An exceptionally good actress for the genre, she was nominated for a Japanese Academy Award for best new actress in her roles in Kihachi Okamoto's film Dynamite Bang Bang and Hideo Gosha's Bandit vs. Samurai Squad (both 1978). She was awarded the Blue Ribbon Award for both of these roles. She was again nominated for a Japanese Academy Award in 1979 for best actress for her role in Woman with Red Hair, and won the Hochi News award for both this role and for Wet Weekend. The following year, she was given a special award for her career at the Yokohama Film Festival.

From the 1980s, she began working more in mainstream films, including two award-winning films for Mitsuo Yanagimachi: Fire Festival (Himatsuri) (1985) and About Love, Tokyo (Ai ni tsuite, Tokyo) (1992). Commenting on his work with Miyashita, director Noboru Tanaka later said, "I liked her natural manner. She always looks very natural, but you can feel the great power and strength that she has. She had a very traditional and conservative Japanese style, but her determination could be seen on the screen... she was a traditional Japanese beauty who also had energy and strength, and that was what I liked about her."

Filmography

1970s 
  (7/1971)
  (9/1971)
  (World Films) (10/1971)
  (Million Film) (12/1971)
  (12/1971)
  (Wakamatsu Films) (12/1971)
 (Million Film) (1/1972)
 (World Films) (1/1972)
 (World Films) (2/1972)
  (2/1972)
  (2/1972)
 (Million Film) (3/1972)
  (3/1972)
 (Million Film) (4/1972)
 (Million Film) (4/1972)
 (World Films) (5/1972)
  (5/1972)
  (5/1972)
 (Million Film) (6/1972)
  (Nikkatsu) (7/8/1972)
  (7/1972)
 ( - Jofu) (Nikkatsu) (8/26/1972) (two roles)
  (8/1972)
 ( - Kage Gari: Hoero Taihô) (10/10/1972)
 ( - Danchizuma Onna-Zakari) (Nikkatsu) (10/28/1972)
 (Wakamatsu Productions) (11/7/1972)
  (Nikkatsu) (11/18/1972)
 ( - OL Nikki Mesuneko no Joji) (Nikkatsu) (12/16/1972)
 Office Lady Journal: Poaching (OL Nikki: Mitsuryo) (1972)
 ( - Danchizuma Ubawareta Yoru) (Nikkatsu) (1/13/1973
  (1/1973)
 ( - Uresugita Chibusa: Hitozuma) (Nikkatsu) (2/3/1973)
 ( - Maruhi Ooku Gaiden Amadera In no Mon)  (Nikkatsu) (2/211973)
 ( - Jitsuroku Kazuko Shirakawa: Hadaka no Rirekisho) (Nikkatsu) (2/21/1973) (cameo)
 ( - Danchizuma Kanki no Yoru) (Nikkatsu) (3/14/1973)
  (Nikkatsu) (4/4/1973)
  (Nikkatsu) (4/14/1973)
 (Nikkatsu) (5/5/1973)
  (Nikkatsu) (5/23/1973)
 (Nikkatsu) (6/13/1973)
  (Nikkatsu) (7/4/1973)
 ( - Ai ni Nureta Watashi) (Nikkatsu) (7/25/1973)
  (Nikkatsu) (8/4/1973)
  (Nikkatsu) (8/15/1973)
  (Nikkatsu) (9/12/1973)
 ( - Sasurai Kamome: Kushiro no Yoru) (Nikkatsu) (10/05/1973)
   (Nikkatsu) (10/24/1973)
  (Nikkatsu) (11/3/1973)
 ( - OL Nikki Mitsuryo: Asaru) (Nikkatsu) (12/5/1973)
  (Nikkatsu) (1/3/1974)
  (Nikkatsu) (1/15/1974)
  (Nikkatsu) (2/16/1974)
  (Nikkatsu) (4/20/1974)
  (Nikkatsu) (6/22/1974)
  (Nikkatsu) (7/6/1974)
  (Nikkatsu) (7/20/1974)
  (Nikkatsu) (8/3/1974)
  (Nikkatsu) (9/11/1974)
  (Nikkatsu) (9/21/1974)
  (10/26/1974)
  (1/14/1975)
  (Nikkatsu) (2/8/1975)
  (Nikkatsu) (4/26/1975)
  (Nikkatsu) (7/23/1975)
 (Shintōhō Eiga) (7/1975)
  (Nikkatsu) (9/6/1975)
  (Nikkatsu) (9/20/1975)
 (Shintōhō Eiga) (9/1975)
  (Nikkatsu) (10/18/1975)
  (Nikkatsu) (12/24/1975)
 Documentary on High School Girls Prostitution Ring (Jitsuroku Jokosei Shudan Baishun) (Wakamatsu Films) (1975)
  (2/21/1976)
  (3/15/1976)
  (Nikkatsu) (5/1/1976)
  (Nikkatsu) (6/12/1976)
  (Nikkatsu) (7/31/1976)
 ( - Ah!! Hana no Oh-Endan) (8/21/1976)
 ( - Tokyo Himitsu Hotel: Kemono no Tawamure) (Nikkatsu) (10/20/1976)
  (Nikkatsu) (11/27/1976)
 ( - Ah!! Hana no Oh-Endan: Yakusha Ya Noh) (Nikkatsu) (12/25/1976)
   (Nikkatsu) (1/22/1977)
  (1/22/1977)
  (Nikkatsu) (2/23/1977)
 ( - Furenzoku Satsujin Jiken) (3/15/1977)
 ( - Ah!! Hana no Oh-Endan: Otoko Namida no Shineitai) (Nikkatsu) (3/19/1977)
  (Nikkatsu) (4/23/1977)
  (Nikkatsu) (5/21/1977)
  (6/25/1977)
  (7/23/1977)
 ( - Hirusagari no Joji: Susurinaki) (10/15/1977)
  (12/24/1977)
 Teacher's Mark Card (Sensei no Tsushinbo) (1977)
  (1/21/1978)
  (Nikkatsu) (3/4/1978)
  (Shochiku＝) (7/1/1978)
  (8/19/1978)
  (10/7/1978)
 ( - Hakatakko Junjô) (12/2/1978)
  (Nikkatsu) (12/23/1978)
  (Nikkatsu) (2/17/1979)
 ( - Kinjirareta Taiken) (Nikkatsu) (3/17/1979)
  (Nikkatsu) (7/21/1979)
  (Nikkatsu) (9/22/1979)
  (11/3/1979)
  (12/1/1979)
  (1979)

1980s 
  (2/16/1980)
  (Shochiku＝) (6/28/1980)
 Koichiro Uno's Shell Competition (Uno Koichiro no Kaikurabe) (7/19/1980)
 (Nikkatsu) (10/18/1980)
  (Nikkatsu) (11/21/1980)
 ( - Shikake-nin Baian) (Toei) (4/11/1981)
 ( - Danpu Wataridori) (Toei) (4/29/1981)
 ( - Mayonaka no Shôtaijô) (Shochiku) (9/26/1981)
  (10/3/1981)
 ( - Toritate no Kagayaki) (Toei) (10/10/1981)
 Ekisutora (1982)
  (9/4/1982)
 ( - Chichi to Ko)  (1/15/1983)
 Namidabashi (1983)
 ( - Jukkai no Mosquito) (7/2/1983)
  (4/14/1984)
 (Shochiku) (8/4/1984)
  (5/25/1985)
  (Shochiku＝) (10/26/1985)
 ( - Ma no Toki) (1985)
 ( - Tomo yo Shizukani Nemure) (1985)
  (1985)
 ( - Koibitotachino Jikoku) (3/14/1987)
  (12/1/1987)
  (1987)
  (1988)
 ( - Bungakusho Satsujin Jiken: Oinaru Joso) (1/28/1989)
  (6/24/1989)

1990s 
 (Toei Video) (12/14/1990)
 ( - Isan Sôzoku) (1990)
  (4/6/1991)
  (Toei Video) (5/17/1991)
  (2/19/1993)
  (10/22/1994)
  (Toei Video) (9/8/1995)
 (11/9/1996)
 (ＭＵＳＡＳＨＩ) ) (11/3/1996)
 ( - Niji o Tsukamu Otoko) (Shochiku) (12/28/1996)
 (Toei Video) (2/14/1997)
 ( - Shin Sarariiman Senka) (Shochiku＝) (11/22/1997)
 Zakuro Yakata (1997)
 (Toei Video) (6/12/1998)
 ( - Dai-Nana Kankai Hoko: Osaki Midori o Sagashite) (7/3/1999)

2000s 
 ( - Mamotte Agetai) (3/4/2000)
 Kamome (Kamome) (3/4/2000)
  (2000)
 (7/6/2002)
 (12/14/2002)
  (10/13/2003)
  (10/2/2004)
  (11/13/2004)
  (12/14/2002)
  (2005)
  (2006)
 One Night in Ruder
  (June 2008)

2010s 
 Maestro! (2015)
 Saraba Abunai Deka (2016)

2020s 
 The Voice of Sin (2020)

Notes

Sources
 
 
 
 
  at movie.goo.ne.jp (in Japanese)

External links 
 

Pink film actors
Actresses from Tokyo
1949 births
Living people